The 1983 Upper Voltan coup d'état attempt was an event that took place on 28 February 1983, in the Republic of Upper Volta (today Burkina Faso), just a few months after a previous coup d'état on 7 November 1982 by radical elements of the army against the regime of Colonel Saye Zerbo, who himself came to power in a 1980 coup against Major General Sangoulé Lamizana.

The coup attempt on 28 February, which targeted the Council of Popular Salvation (CPS) and its leader Major Jean-Baptiste Ouédraogo, failed.

Events
Several army officers intended to massacre the CPS in assembly and restore Zerbo's regime. When they delayed they were arrested by other officials. One of the leading putschists was a commandant who had been considered for the presidency following the 1982 coup. When questioned about the incident, Ouédraogo told the press, "Since our regime makes many people uneasy, it is quite normal that people should plan this sort of reaction." He publicly declared his determination to "guarantee order and security" and asserted that "the army will not allow itself to be dissuaded by tribal fights and ideologies". He also stated that corruption and fraud in the business community had, in part, facilitated the state of "total anarchy" over which the government presided, and announced that the national administration would be restructured to mitigate the disorder.

See also
 1983 Upper Voltan coup d'état
History of Burkina Faso

Citations

References 
 
 

1983 02 Upper Volta
Attempted coups d'état in Burkina Faso
1983 02 Upper Volta
1983 02 Upper Volta
1983 02 Upper Voltan coup d'etat attempt
February 1983 events in Africa